Skitter on Take-Off is the final album by Vic Chesnutt. It was his only album for Vapor Records.

A different version of "Sewing Machine" was originally included on brute's 1995 release Nine High a Pallet (brute consisted of Vic Chesnutt backed by the members of Widespread Panic).

Track listing
"Feast in the Time of Plague" – 3:53
"Unpacking My Suitcase" – 3:20
"Dimples" – 4:09
"Rips in the Fabric" – 6:00
"Society Sue" – 2:51
"My New Life" – 4:11
"Dick Cheney" – 3:18
"Worst Friend" – 7:46
"Sewing Machine" – 4:01

Personnel
Vic Chesnutt – vocals, guitar
Tommy Larkins – drums
Jonathan Richman – guitar, harmonium

References

2009 albums
Vic Chesnutt albums
Vapor Records albums
Albums produced by Jonathan Richman